Planifilum fimeticola  is a Gram-positive and thermophilic bacterium from the genus of Planifilum which has been isolated from hyperthermal compost in Japan.

References

Further reading

External links
Type strain of Planifilum fimeticola at BacDive -  the Bacterial Diversity Metadatabase	

Bacillales
Bacteria described in 2005
Thermophiles